Éric Cyr (born February 11, 1979) is a Canadian former professional baseball pitcher. He previously played in Major League Baseball (MLB) for the San Diego Padres, as well as in the Chinese Professional Baseball League (CPBL) for the Uni-President Lions.

Baseball career
Cyr graduated from Edouard Montpetit High School in Montreal and attended Seminole State College in Oklahoma.

He was drafted by the San Diego Padres in the 30th round of the 1998 MLB draft and signed with the Padres on May 31, .

Cyr made his professional debut in 1999, splitting time between the Azl Padres and the Idaho Falls Chukars of the rookie leagues.

During the 2000–01 offseason, Cyr played winter ball in Australia. He was suspended at the beginning of the season due to an arrest.

In , he played with Lake Elsinore Storm. With the Storm he had a terrific season, turning in a record of 7–4 with a 1.61 ERA in 21 appearances (16 starts) and striking out 131 batters while only walking 24.

He made his Major League Baseball debut for the Padres on June 23, 2002, against the New York Yankees, working one scoreless inning in relief. He played in 5 games that year, going 0–1 with an ERA of 10.50 in 6 innings of total work.

Cyr was claimed off waivers by the Anaheim Angels on March 5,  and pitched briefly for the Angels Double-A team in Arkansas before the Angeles waived him and he was claimed by the Cincinnati Reds, who sent him to Chattanooga. After a short stint there, he was returned to the Angels.

Cyr pitched for both Arkansas and the Salt Lake Stingers in  before leaving the Angels to take part in the 2004 Summer Olympics as part of Team Canada.
 

He was on the  Canadian WBC Roster. Shortly before attending the 2006 WBC, he signed with CPBL's Uni-President Lions in Taiwan. He departed the Uni-President Lions in September 2006, leaving a record of 9 wins (including 2 shutouts), 5 losses, and an ERA of 2.52, a WHIP of 1.23 in his 128.2 innings during the 2006 CPBL season.

After finishing with the Uni-President Lions, he started one game for the Quebec Capitales of the Canadian-American Association of Professional Baseball giving up only 4 hits and no walks in eight shut-out innings before quitting the team to join Team Canada at the qualifiers for the 2008 Olympic Games in Beijing, China.

In , he signed a minor league contract with the Los Angeles Dodgers, compiling a record of 6–3 with a 3.18 ERA in 16 starts for the Jacksonville Suns before being promoted to the Las Vegas 51s, where he was 3–6 with a 5.56 ERA in 12 games, 11 as a starter.

After a stint pitching with Quebec of the Canadian American Baseball league, where he was named player of the week ending on May 25, 2008, he was again picked up by the Dodgers and assigned to the Inland Empire 66ers of San Bernardino and later promoted to the Las Vegas 51s. He became a free agent at the end of the season.

Early in 2009, he announced that he was planning on joining the Sherbrooke Expos a senior team in the Ligue de baseball senior élite du Québec.

, he was married to alpine skier Sara-Maude Boucher. Their son, Simon-Xavier, was born in 2008. He has another daughter with his first wife named Chloé Cyr.

Sexual assault conviction and jail 
In April 2001, Cyr turned himself into the Federal Bureau of Investigation and was charged with having had sex with a 15-year-old girl while on a Qantas Airways flight from Australia to Los Angeles that January. In December 2001, he pleaded guilty in the United States District Court for the Central District of California to a misdemeanor charge of sexual contact with another without consent. He was sentenced to a year of probation and given credit for thirty days served in jail. In 2004, the woman, then 18, filed suit against Cyr, Qantas, the San Diego Padres and the Lake Elsinore Storm.

References

External links
, or Retrosheet, or Pura Pelota (VPBL stats)

1979 births
Living people
Arizona League Angels players
Arizona League Padres players
Arkansas Travelers players
Baseball players at the 2004 Summer Olympics
Baseball players from Montreal
Canadian expatriate baseball players in Taiwan
Canadian expatriate baseball players in the United States
Cangrejeros de Santurce (baseball) players
Canadian expatriate baseball players in Puerto Rico
Cardenales de Lara players
Chattanooga Lookouts players
Fort Wayne Wizards players
French Quebecers
Idaho Falls Braves players
Inland Empire 66ers of San Bernardino players
Jacksonville Suns players
Lake Elsinore Storm players
Las Vegas 51s players
Leones del Caracas players
Canadian expatriate baseball players in Venezuela
Liga de Béisbol Profesional Roberto Clemente pitchers
Lobos de Arecibo players
Major League Baseball pitchers
Major League Baseball players from Canada
Mobile BayBears players
Olympic baseball players of Canada
Portland Beavers players
Québec Capitales players
Salt Lake Stingers players
San Diego Padres players
Seminole State Raiders baseball players
Tacoma Rainiers players
Uni-President Lions players
World Baseball Classic players of Canada
2006 World Baseball Classic players
Sportspeople convicted of crimes
Canadian expatriate baseball players in Australia
Canadian male criminals
Criminals from Montreal
21st-century Canadian criminals
Prisoners and detainees of the United States federal government